Abdullahi Tetengi (born 15 July 1969) is a retired Nigerian athlete who competed in sprinting events. He represented his country at the 1988 Summer Olympics and 1990 Commonwealth Games. In addition, he won two silver medals at the 1990 African Championships.

International competitions

Personal bests
Outdoor
100 metres – 10.12	(Bauchi 1990)
200 metres – 20.39	(Bauchi 1990)
Indoor
60 metres – 6.85 (Seville 1991)
200 metres – 21.76	(Seville 1991)

References

External links 
 
 
All-Athletics profile

1969 births
Living people
Nigerian male sprinters
Olympic athletes of Nigeria
Athletes (track and field) at the 1988 Summer Olympics
Commonwealth Games medallists in athletics
Commonwealth Games silver medallists for Nigeria
Athletes (track and field) at the 1990 Commonwealth Games
20th-century Nigerian people
Medallists at the 1990 Commonwealth Games